Brian Ridgeway (born April 26, 1984) is a Canadian football linebacker most recently for the Montreal Alouettes of the Canadian Football League. He was drafted 39th overall by the Alouettes in the 2010 CFL Draft. He originally played CIS Football with the Simon Fraser Clan, but due to that school's program joining NCAA Division II, he played his final year of CIS eligibility with the Saint Mary's Huskies.

External links
Just Sports Stats
Montreal Alouettes bio

1984 births
Living people
Canadian football linebackers
Montreal Alouettes players
People from Grande Prairie
Players of Canadian football from Alberta
Saint Mary's Huskies football players
Simon Fraser Clan football players